Michel Najjar is a Lebanese politician. From 21 January to 10 August 2020, he served as Minister of Public Works and Transport in the cabinet of Hassan Diab.

References 

Living people
Year of birth missing (living people)
Place of birth missing (living people)
Government ministers of Lebanon

Marada Movement politicians